Jami Kyöstilä (born 2 March 1996) is a Finnish footballer who plays as a defender for HJS.

Club career
On 3 February 2022, Kyöstilä joined HJS in the third-tier Kakkonen.

Honours
FC Haka
 Ykkönen: 2019

References

1996 births
Living people
Finnish footballers
Association football defenders
FC Haka players
Veikkausliiga players